In Concert 1987: Abigail is a live album by Danish heavy metal band King Diamond which was recorded in 1987 but released in 1991.

Track listing
All songs written by King Diamond unless otherwise noted.
 "Funeral" – 1:55 
 "Arrival" – 5:47 
 "Come to the Sabbath" – 5:43 
 "The Family Ghost" – 4:25 
 "The 7th Day of July 1777" (Andy LaRocque, Diamond) – 4:26 
 "The Portrait" – 4:46 
 "Guitar Solo Andy" (LaRocque) – 3:35 
 "The Possession"  (Michael Denner, Diamond) – 3:52 
 "Abigail" – 4:28 
 "Drum Solo" (Mikkey Dee) – 3:25 
 "The Candle" – 6:01 
 "No Presents for Christmas" (Denner, Diamond) – 4:23

Credits
King Diamond – vocals
Andy LaRocque – guitars
Mike Moon – guitars
Timi Hansen – bass
Mikkey Dee – drums

References

King Diamond albums
1991 live albums
Roadrunner Records live albums